Dominion Car and Foundry was a railcar maker based in Montreal and later merged to form Canadian Car and Foundry in 1909.

DCF's history dates back before the company's formal incorporation in 1906. In 1902 Simplex Railway and Appliance Company of Hammond, Indiana established a factory in St. Henri district of Montreal to manufacturer Simplex car bolsters and Susemihl roller side bearings for use on Canadian railway cars.

Formally established in 1906 as Dominion Steel Car Company, it later changed the name to Dominion Car and Foundry. DCF was essentially an American branch plant linked to Simplex and the American Steel Foundries Company.

Clients

 D&H - subsidiary of Quebec, Montreal and Southern
 Canadian Pacific Railway
 Winnipeg Electric Railway Company
 Montreal Street Railway

Products
 standard box cars
 steel box cars
 double wood sheathed box cars
 streetcars 
 electric dump cars

See also

 Canadian Car and Foundry
 Canada Car Company

References
 Dominion Car and Foundry Company Limited

Manufacturing companies based in Montreal
Defunct rolling stock manufacturers of Canada